Temnopleuridae is a family of sea urchins in the infraorder Temnopleuridea.

Genera
 Amblypneustes L. Agassiz, 1841
 Erbechinus Jeannet, 1935
 Holopneustes L. Agassiz, 1841
 Mespilia Desor in L. Agassiz & Desor, 1846
 Microcyphus L. Agassiz in L. Agassiz & Desor, 1846
 Opechinus Desor, 1856
 Paratrema Koehler, 1927
 †Placentinechinus Borghi & Garilli, 2016
 Printechinus Koehler, 1927
 Pseudechinus Mortensen, 1903
 Salmaciella Mortensen, 1942
 Salmacis L. Agassiz, 1841
 Temnopleurus L. Agassiz, 1841
 Temnotrema A. Agassiz, 1864

References